Royal Blues Taipei were a Taiwanese professional football club based in Taipei.

In 2014/15 they won the BML League Title (2nd Division), only losing once in the process. On 16 August 2015, the Royal Blues won promotion to Division 1  and finished 5th. They competed in the 2017 and 2018 editions of the Taiwan Football Premier League.

Final squad

N.B. league regulations have imposed no foreigner limitations for the Chinese Taipei Taiwan Football Premier League Season 2017.

Technical staff

 Head coach:  Robert Iwanicki
 Assistant coach:  Anthony Hewitt 
 Assistant coach:  Dario De Stefano
 Assistant coach:  Thomas Costa
 Executive Officer:  Hsuan Wei Wang

References

External links
  Taiwan’s Bureaucratic Barriers Stop development of Royal Blues Players

Football clubs in Taiwan
Association football clubs established in 2009
Sport in Taipei
2009 establishments in Taiwan